The AP convoys were a series of Arabian Sea convoys which ran during World War II.

They take their name from the route: Aden and Bandar Abbas, Persia

Overview 
The AP series was the reverse of PA series that ran from September 1942 until January 1945. There were 92 AP convoys, comprising 615 individual ship listings and 215 escorts. Some of the ships listed in a convoy did not always make the complete trip between Aden and Bandar Abbas though, while some continued on to Abadan.

In 1940, there had been five other convoys labeled AP, these are separate from the 1942–1945 series.

Convoy List

1942

1943

1944

1945

Other AP convoys List

1940 
In September 1940, there were a series of convoys starting in Liverpool, and traveling to Suez, via Cape Town, and Aden, labeled AP.

In April 1940, one convoy, starting in Leith, travelling to Norway, was labeled AP.

Notes 
Citations

Bibliography 

Books
 
 
 
Online resources

External links 
 Full listing of ships sailing in AP convoys

Convoys of World War II